Colasposoma grande is a species of leaf beetle found in Yemen, Oman, Saudi Arabia and the United Arab Emirates. It was first described by Édouard Lefèvre in 1890. It was originally placed in the genus Eryxia, but was moved to the genus Colasposoma (subgenus Falsonerissus) by Stefano Zoia in 2012.

A synonym of this species is Falsonerissus arabicus, described by Maurice Pic in 1951, which was the type and only species of the genus Falsonerissus. Falsonerissus is now considered a subgenus of Colasposoma.

Subspecies
There are two subspecies of C. grande:
 Colasposoma grande grande (Lefèvre, 1890) – Yemen (mainland), Oman, Saudi Arabia, the United Arab Emirates
 Colasposoma grande insulare Zoia, 2012 – Yemen (Socotra)

References

grande
Beetles of Asia
Insects of the Arabian Peninsula
Taxa named by Édouard Lefèvre
Beetles described in 1890